The 1922 Birthday Honours were appointments by King George V to various orders and honours to reward and highlight good works by citizens of the British Empire. The appointments were made to celebrate the official birthday of The King, and were published in The London Gazette on 2 June 1922.

Controversy from the 1922 Birthday Honours list eventually led to the passage of the Honours (Prevention of Abuses) Act 1925 and creation of the Honours Committee to formally review nominations. Sir Joseph Benjamin Robinson, chairman of the Robinson South African Banking Company and generous contributor to Prime Minister David Lloyd George's Liberal Party, was listed for a barony "for national and imperial services." Robinson quickly declined the honour within weeks after arguments erupted in the House of Lords over the circumstances of his nomination, particularly his residency in South Africa rather than in Great Britain, and that he was not recommended for the honour directly by the South African colonial government as required. "Feeling in the House of Lords ran high," reported The Times on 30 June. The Times praised Robinson's letter to the King asking for permission to decline the honour, and pushed for further questioning into the matter: "..by his action Sir Joseph Robinson has placed himself in the right and has left the Government to explain, if they can, how and why they placed themselves in the wrong. It seems clear from the letter that Sir Joseph Robinson did not in any way seek the honour. Therefore, some person or persons unknown must have sought to induce him to accept it. Who are those persons, what are their functions, and what were their motives?"

The recipients of honours are displayed here as they were styled before their new honour, and arranged by honour, with classes (Knight, Knight Grand Cross, etc.) and then divisions (Military, Civil, etc.) as appropriate.

United Kingdom and British Empire

Baron

Sir Robert Hudson Borwick  by the name, style and title of Baron Borwick, of Hawkshead in the County of Lancaster. Senior partner in the firm of George Borwick & Sons, Ltd. Rendered great service. to the Government in providing hospital treatment for the sick and wounded Colonial officers throughout the war. A large contributor to the Officers Families Fund, and a generous supporter of the Red Cross Society. 
Sir William Vestey  by the name, style and title of Baron Vestey, of Kingswood, in the county of Surrey. Managing Director of the Union Cold Storage Company, Ltd. Has devoted his life to the production and preservation of food supplies by refrigeration, and has opened up numerous new sources of supply of refrigerated products from various parts of the world that have materially helped to cheapen the food supply of the people. Rendered immense service during the war to the country, and provided gratuitously the cold storage accommodation required for war purposes at Havre, Boulogne and Dunkirk. Head of the Blue Star Line. Has done much relief work for the poor, both in Liverpool and London, and generously contributes to charities.
Sir Samuel James Waring  by the name, style and title of Baron Waring, of Foots Cray, in the County of Kent. Director of Waring & Gillow, Ltd. Director of the Duchess of Sutherland's Cripples Guild. High Sheriff of Denbighshire 1907–8. Member of Executive Committee of National Association of Ex-Soldiers. Pioneer of decorative art in furnishing. Active supporter of Boy Scout Movement. Founder of Higher Production Council. Generous supporter of charities.
The Rt. Honorary Sir Archibald Williamson  by the name, style and title of Baron Forres, of Glenogil, in the county of Forfar. Financial and Parliamentary Secretary to the War Office 1919–21.

Privy Councillor
The King appointed the following to His Majesty's Most Honourable Privy Council:
Lieutenant-Colonel Leopold Charles Maurice Stennett Amery  Parliamentary and Financial Secretary to the Admiralty since 1921. Member of Parliament for the Sparkbrook Division of Birmingham since 1918. Fellow of All Souls College, Oxford.
Lieutenant-Colonel Leslie Orme Wilson  Joint Parliamentary Secretary to the Treasury. Member of Parliament for Reading since 1913.
The Hon. William Lyon Mackenzie King  Prime Minister and Secretary of State for External Affairs, Dominion of Canada

Baronetcies

Robert James Black. Chairman Mercantile Bank of India since 1906. Director of Shell Transport Company and of the London Bank of Australia. Identified with many charitable undertakings. Has been an important factor in stabilising and carrying on Anglo-Indian Finance.
Lieutenant-Colonel Dennis Fortescue Boles  Member of Parliament for West Somerset 1911–18, and for Taunton Division, December 1918 to 1921. Lieutenant-Colonel late commanding 3rd Battalion, Devonshire Regiment.
Harry Mallaby-Deeley  Member of Parliament for East Willesden since 1910. Rendered great public service in connection with the last War Loan, duplicating the subscriptions in many places with considerable loss to himself. For public services
John Frederick Drughorn. Director of Fred Drughorn, Ltd., The Anglo-Brazilian Line, Ltd., and the British and Continental Estates, Ltd. Generous contributor to the King's Fund and other charities.
Brigadier-General Hugh Henry John Williams Drummond  Chairman of the London and South Western Railway Company since 1911
Lieutenant-Colonel Sir John Norton-Griffiths  Member of Parliament for Wednesbury from 1910 to 1918 and for Wandsworth Central since 1918. Late Lieutenant-Colonel 2nd King Edward's Horse. Rendered valuable War services.
Hildebrand Aubrey Harmsworth, For public services.
Sir John Harrison  Mayor of Stockton-on-Tees for the fifth time. Member of the Durham County Council, Tees Pilotage Board. Chairman of Education Committee. Has taken a very active part in the public life of Stockton-on-Tees. For public and local services.
Lieutenant-Colonel Emmanuel Hoyle  Has taken an active part in the local government of the town of Huddersfield and rendered great municipal service there. Has given very largely to charities and also expended much time and money on Clubs and Hospitals for soldiers throughout the war
Sir Berkeley George Andrew Moynihan  Army Medical Advisory Board. Professor of Clinical Surgery, University of Leeds. Hon. Surgeon Leeds General Infirmary. Member of Council of Royal College of Surgeons of England.
Edmund Nuttall  Head of the firm of Nuttall and Co., Civil Engineers and Contractors, of Manchester. The firm has been responsible for numerous engineering works of national importance. Has been associated with many philanthropic works. For national services.
Edward Sharp. Head of the firm which bears his name. Generous contributor to charities in Maidstone and in Kent. Has been President of the National Sunday School Union. Has taken a keen interest in and been a generous supporter of many public institutions.
Sir Edward David Stern  Deputy Lieutenant for Surrey. High Sheriff 1904. Head of the firm of Stern Brothers. A generous benefactor to charities. 
George Sutton  Chairman and Managing Director of Henley's Telegraph Works. One of the founders and past Chairman of the Cable Makers Association. Founded a number of scholarships for elementary school children at secondary schools. A generous contributor to a large number of charities. Served on Beckenham Education Committee for 19 years and on the Beckenham Urban District Council for 12 years.
Woolmer Rudolph Donati White  Deputy Lieutenant for Hampshire. Head of the firm of Timothy White and Co., Chemists and Merchants. Carried on for many years a free school for poor children in Portsmouth, High Sheriff for the county of Norfolk in 1914, and rendered great service in recruiting. Liberal subscriber to hospitals and charities.

Knight Bachelor

Edwin Airey, Governing Director of William Airey & Son, Engineers and Contractors. Rendered considerable assistance to the Ministry of Munitions during the war, and subsequently to the Ministry of Health. An active participant in the direction of many Organisations for social welfare and education
Hugh Kerr Anderson  Master of Gonville and Caius College, Cambridge, since 1912.
Lieutenant-Colonel Alan Hughes Burgoyne  Member of Parliament for North Kensington since 1910. Director of P. B. Burgoyne & Co., Ltd. Has written much upon naval questions and founded the Navy League Annual in 1907, which he edited for seven years
James William Bulmer, Head of the Firm of Smith, Bulmer & Co., Worsted Spinners, of Halifax. Served on the Wool Statistical Committee and on the Wool Textile Control Board. Chairman of Executive of Yorkshire National Liberal Council. For public services.
Herbert Atkinson Barker, Specialist in manipulating surgery
Robert Appleby Bartram  One of the Senior DLs of Sunderland. Leading educationalist from 1870. A generous, benefactor to charitable, religious and educational bodies in Sunderland.
William Haddock Bayliss  Professor of General Physiology in University College, London. Is recognised as one of the leading physiologists of the world. His researches in the War afforded the scientific basis of treatment which resulted in conspicuous benefit to the troops and the saving of many lives
Thomas Brodrick  General Secretary and Accountant of the Co-operative Wholesale Society, Ltd. Celebrates his Jubilee in the service of the Co-operative movement this year
Walter Herbert Cockerline. Ex-Sheriff of the City of Hull. Member of the Council of the North of England Shipowners Association. Has devoted much time to the public service.
Edward Thomas Frederick Crowe  Commercial Counselor at His Majesty's Embassy at Tokyo. A senior Member of the Commercial Diplomatic Service
Henry Fielding Dickens  Treasurer of the Inner Temple. Common Sgt. since 1917
Ernest John Fawke. A Director of the Central and Western Corporation. Has interested himself regarding Smoke and Noxious Vapours abatement reported upon by Lord Newton's Committee.
Charles Harding Firth  Regius Professor of Modern History at Oxford since 1904. 
Robert Septimus Gardiner, Editor of the Near East, a publication much valued in Egypt, Palestine and the East. Manager of important Colliery and Shipping undertakings in the North of England.
Charles Tyrrell Giles  North Cambridge 1895–1900. Chairman Wimbledon Conservative Association for1 20 years. High Sheriff of Surrey 1915–16. Deputy Lieutenant Surrey 1915
Dan Godfrey, Director of Music to the Corporation of Bournemouth since 1893. For valuable services to British Music
Major Collingwood George Clements Hamilton  Member of Parliament for the Altrincham Division of Cheshire since 1913. Director of Enrollment National Service, 1917. Parliamentary Private Secretary to the Minister of Pensions, 1919–20
Ernest Montague Hughman, Late Partner in Pyne, Hughman & Co., Engineers and Shipbuilders. Member of Council of Institution of Engineers, India, and Honorary Secretary, Indian Council, English Institution of Electrical Engineers. For public services.
Edward Mauger Iliffe  Director of Iliffe & Sons, Publishers. Controller of Machine Tool Department of the Ministry of Munitions. President of Coventry Chamber of Commerce. Devoted much time to hospital, municipal and local public work
Alderman William Kay, twice Lord Mayor of Manchester. For public services.
Professor Frederick William Keeble  Sherardian Professor of Botany and Fellow of Magdalen College, Oxford
John Arthur Levy, Adviser to the Government in regard to diamond trading during the war.
Maurice Lowe, For services rendered at Washington in connection with the Press.
John Macpherson  Professor of Psychiatry in the University of Sydney, N.S.W. Medical Commissioner in Lunacy for Scotland, 1899. Has rendered excellent service in connection with Scottish Lunacy administration.
Robert McCraken, Chairman of the firm of Steel Brothers & Company, Fenchurch Street. Represented Burmah in London Chamber of Commerce for many years. Generous contributor to London charities.
William Mills, Inventor of the Mills Hand Grenade, used exclusively and successfully by the British and other Allies throughout the war, and of which seventy-five millions were supplied. Member of the Council of the Birmingham Chamber of Commerce. Member of the Imperial Mineral Resources Bureau
John Ashley Mullens, Government Broker
Alfred James Rice-Oxley  Three times Mayor of Kensington
Albert Lindsay Parkinson  Member of Parliament for Blackpool since 1918. Mayor of Blackpool from 1916–19, and was conspicuously energetic and successful in all work connected with the war during that period
Edward James Pollock, Official Referee since 1897
Samuel Murray Power  Chief Clerk, Irish Office, 1909-1922
Charles Thornton Pulley  Late Member of Parliament for Hereford, and formerly Chairman of the Hereford Division cf the Unionist Association. Chairman during the war of the South Herefordshire Joint Parliamentary Recruiting Committee, and Chairman of many other Committees formed to carry on war work in Herefordshire
Henry Norman Rae  Member of Parliament for Shipley Division of Yorkshire. For public services during and after the war.
Edward John Russell  Director of Rothamsted Experimental Station under the Ministry of Agriculture
William Fleming Russell  President of the Glasgow Chamber of Commerce. A member of the Glasgow Town Council for many years. Honorary President of the Scottish Unionist Association, and at present Chairman of its Western Divisional Council
David Maurice Serjeant  Holds unique position as Colonist, Volunteer, patriotic writer and municipal worker
Thomas Shipstone, Chairman and Managing Director of James Shipstone and Sons, Ltd., of Nottingham. Magistrate of the city and a Governor of the Nottingham General Hospital. A generous contributor to many charitable and philanthropic institutions. Rendered important service to the Red Cross Society during the war, presenting amongst other things a fully equipped motor ambulance.
Sydney Martin Skinner, Chairman of John Barker and Co., and of Employers Organisation for the distributive trade. Has also done much municipal work, being Chairman of various Committees and Higher Education Committees. A generous contributor to philanthropic and charitable institutions. For public services.
Major Hugh James Protheroe Thomas  Partner in the firm of James Thomas and Son, established 120 years, Land and Estate Agency. Owner of the town of Milford Haven, which he freed from all tolls amounting to many thousands of pounds. Deputy Lieutenant and Deputy Lieutenant for the County of Haverfordwest.
William Walker  Recently retired from the post of Director of Health and Safety in the Mines Department of the Board of Trade
Henry Whitehead, Director of the firm, of Sir Titus Salt and Co. President of the Bradford Chamber of Commerce. Generous public benefactor. For public and war services.
James Edward Woods  Deputy Lieutenant for the city and county of Newcastle upon Tyne. High Sheriff for the County of Northumberland. Honorary Treasurer of the Royal Victoria Infirmary. For 26 years Honorary Treasurer to the Northern Union of Conservative and Constitutional Associations. A most generous supporter of all local charities.

British India
Khan Bahadur Muhammad Habibullah Sahib Bahadur, Member of the Executive Council, Madras
Justice Jwala Prasad Raj Bahadur, Puisne Judge of the High Court of Judicature, Patna, Bihar and Orissa
Henry Sharp  Secretary to the Government of India, Education Department
Robert Sidney Giles, Vice-Chancellor, University of Rangoon, Burma
Reginald Clarke  Commissioner of Police, Calcutta, Bengal
Claude Fraser de la Fosse  Director of Public Instruction (now on special duty), United Provinces
Khan Bahadur Ahmad Tambi Ghulani Muhiud-Din Ahmad Tambi Marakkayar, Merchant, Negapatam, Madras
M. R. Ry. Diwan Bahadur Tirumalai Desika Achariyar Avargal, Member of the Madras Legislative Council, and President of the Trichinopoly District Board, Madras
Hormusjee Cowasjee Dinshaw  Senior partner in firm of Messrs. Cowasjee Dinshaw and Brothers, Aden
Raj Onkar Mull Jatia Bahadur  Banker and Merchant, Calcutta, Bengal
Charles Porten Beachcroft, Indian Civil Service (retired), late Puisne Judge, Calcutta High Court, Bengal
Raj Bahadur Lala Ganga Ram  Executive Engineer, Public Works Department, Punjab (retired)
Rao Bahadur Pandit Sukhdeo Pershad  Political and Revenue Member, Council of Regency, Jodhpur, Rajputana
Manubhai Nandshankar Mehta  Minister, Baroda

Colonies, Protectorates, etc.

Lieutenant-Colonel Charles Llewellyn Andersson  Officer Commanding Civic Guard, Johannesburg, Union of South Africa
Jacob William Barth  Chief Justice of His Majesty's Supreme Court of Kenya
The Hon. Walter Charles Frederick Carncross, Speaker of the Legislative Council, Dominion of New Zealand
Charles Pitcher Clarke  Attorney-General, Barbados
Julius Jeppe  of Johannesburg, Union of South Africa, in recognition of public services
Thomas Ranken Lyle  Chairman of the Electricity Commissioners of the State of Victoria
John Charles Peter, Manager of the Hong Kong and Shanghai Banking Corporation, Singapore, Straits Settlements
Mark Sheldon, of the City of Sydney, in recognition of services rendered to the Commonwealth of Australia
George Tallis, of the City of Melbourne, in recognition of services rendered to the Commonwealth, of Australia
William Thomson  lately Registrar of the University of South Africa, in recognition of his services to higher education in the Union of South Africa
Clarkson Henry Tredgold  Senior Judge of the High Court of Southern Rhodesia

The Most Honourable Order of the Bath

Knight Grand Cross of the Order of the Bath (GCB)

Military Division
Royal Navy
Admiral the Hon. Sir Somerset Arthur Gough-Calthorpe

Knight Commander of the Order of the Bath (KCB)

Military Division
Royal Navy
Rear-Admiral Sir Alfred Ernle Montacute Chatfield 
Surgeon Vice-Admiral Sir Robert Hill 

Army
Lieutenant-General Sir James Frederick Noel Birch  (Colonel Commandant, Royal Artillery), Director-General of the Territorial Army
Major-General Sir Gerald Francis Ellison  Deputy Quartermaster-General, War Office
Major-General Warren Hastings Anderson  Commandant, Staff College, Camberley
Major-General Alfred Percy Blenkinsop  Deputy Director of Medical Services, Eastern Command
Lieutenant-General Sir Walter Sinclair Delamain  (Colonel, 117th Mahrattas), Indian Army, Adjutant-General, Headquarters, India
Major-General Alexander Wallace  late Indian Army
Colonel Sir William Wilson Hoy  Forces of the Union of South Africa

Civil Division

George William Chrystal  Permanent Secretary, Ministry of Pensions
Walter Frederick Nicholson  Secretary to the Air Ministry
James Arthur Salter  Secretary, Reparation Commission
Robert Russell Scott  Controller of Establishments, Treasury
Thomas Lonsdale Webster  Clerk of the House of Commons

Companion of the Order of the Bath (CB)

Military Division
Royal Navy
Rear-Admiral Francis Martin-Leake 
Captain Barry Edward Domvile 
Engineer Captain William Rattey 
Colonel Commandant Gerald Robert Poole  Royal Marine Artillery

Army
Colonel Gilbert Robertson Frith  Colonel on the Staff in charge of Administration, Iraq
Colonel Charles Henry Dudley Ryder  late Royal Engineers
Colonel Graham Henry Whalley Nicholson  Commanding Royal Artillery, Divisional Troops, Southern Command
Colonel Robert Sidney Hamilton  Assistant Director of Ordnance Services, Southern Command
Colonel Harry McMicking  Embarkation Commandant, Southampton
Colonel Bertie Coore Dent  Commander, Baghdad District, Iraq
Major-General Harington Owen Parr  Indian Army, Deputy Adjutant-General, Headquarters, India
Major-General Sir Andrew Skeen  Indian Army, General Officer Commanding, Kohat District, Northern Command, India
Colonel Alexander Leigh Tarver  Indian Army, Brigade Commander, 14th Indian Infantry Brigade

Royal Air Force
Air Commodore John Miles Steel

Civil Division

Captain Edmund Moore Cooper Cooper-Key  (retd.)
Engineer Commander Sydney Undercliffe Hardcastle  
Instructor Captain Horace Herbert Holland 
Captain Charles Edward Irving  
Brigadier-General William Bromley-Davenport  late Territorial Army Reserve
Frank Ashley Barrett, Commissioner and Secretary, Board of Inland Revenue
George Alexander Calder Ex-Secretary, Public Works Loan Board
Sir Frederick William Alfred Clarke. Accountant-General, Board of Customs and Excise
Joseph Beardsell Crosland Senior Director of Finance, War Office
Arthur Lewis Dixon  Assistant Secretary, Home Office
William James Evans  Director of Establishments, Admiralty
Egerton Spencer Grey, Senior Official Receiver in Bankruptcy and Controller of the Enemy Debts Clearing Office in 1919
The Hon. Ronald Charles Lindsay 
Minister Plenipotentiary in the Diplomatio Service. Assistant Under Secretary for Foreign Affairs since January 1921
John Rowland  Commissioner, Welsh Board of Health
Oswald Richard Arthur Simpkin  Public Trustee
Brigadier-General Frederic Herbert Williamson  Assistant Secretary, General Post Office

The Most Exalted Order of the Star of India

Knight Grand Commander (GCSI)

His Excellency the Rt. Hon. Sir Auckland Campbell Geddes  His Majesty's Ambassador Extraordinary and Plenipotentiary to the United States of America

Knight Commander (KCSI)

Raja Sir Muhammad Ali Muhammad Khan, Khan Bahadur  of Mahmudabad, Member of the Governor's Executive Council, United Provinces
Sir Jamsetjee Jejeebhoy  Bombay
Sir Sassoon Jacob David  President, Bombay Municipality
Sir William Mitchell Acworth 
William Grenfell Max Muller  His Majesty's Envoy Extraordinary and Minister Plenipotentiary to the Republic of Poland

Companion (CSI)

Major-General Walter Clarence Black  Indian Army, Military Secretary to His Excellency the Commander-in-Chief
Leslie Harry Saunders, Indian Civil Service, Judicial Commissioner, Upper Burma
George Bancroft Lambert, Indian Civil Service, Chief Secretary to Government, United Provinces
Basil Copleston Allen, Indian Civil Service, Commissioner, Assam Valley Division
John Edward Webster  Indian Civil Service, Commissioner, Surma Valley and Hill Districts, Assam
Thomas Eyebron Moir  Indian Civil Service, Secretary to Government, Finance Department, Madras
M. R. Ry. Diwan Bahadur Raghunatha Rao Ramachandra Rao Avargal, Secretary to Government, Law Department, Madras
Major Cyril Charles Johnson Barrett  Bombay Political Service, First Assistant Resident, Aden
Sir dar Bahadur Nawab Mehrab Khan, Chief of the Bugti tribe, Baluchistan

The Most Distinguished Order of Saint Michael and Saint George

Knight Commander of the Order of St Michael and St George (KCMG)

The Hon. Henry Newman Barwell  Premier and Attorney-General of the State of South Australia
Lieutenant-Colonel Edward Charles Frederick Garraway  Resident Commissioner, Basutoland
John Shuckburgh Risley  Legal Adviser, Colonial Office

Companion of the Order of St Michael and St George (CMG)
William Herbert Barrett, an Assistant General Manager of Railways and Harbours, Union of South Africa
Albert Ruskin Cook  recognition of services to the Uganda Protectorate
James Corbett Davis, Treasurer to the Zanzibar Government
Carl de Verteuil, lately a Member of the Legislative Council of the Colony of Trinidad and Tobago, in recognition of services to agriculture
Alwin Robinson Dickinson, British Phosphate Commissioner
Joseph Firth, in recognition of public services in the Dominion of New Zealand
Arthur George Murchison Fletcher  Assistant Colonial Secretary and Clerk of Councils, Colony of Hong Kong
Colin Campbell Garbett  lately Political Secretary to the High Commissioner and Commander-in-Chief for Iraq
Edward Burns Harkness, Under-Secretary, Department of the Chief Secretary, and Undersecretary, Ministry of Public Health, State of New South Wales
Howard Hitchcock  Mayor of Geelong, in the State of Victoria, in recognition of his public services
Emilius Hopkinson  Travelling Commissioner in the Gambia Protectorate
Arthur Edwin Horn  Director of Medical and Sanitary Services, Straits Settlements and Federated Malay States
Albert Ernest Kitson  Director of Geological Survey, Gold Coast Colony
The Hon. Charles William Oakes, Colonial Secretary, State of New South Wales
Herbert Richmond Palmer, Senior Resident, Northern Provinces, Nigeria
Colonel Robert Francis Peel, Governor and Commander-in-Chief of the Island of Saint Helena
Thomas Alfred Wood  in recognition of public services to Kenya
Lau Chu Pak, Unofficial Member of the Legislative Council of the Colony of Hong Kong (posthumous)

The Most Eminent Order of the Indian Empire

Knight Grand Commander (GCIE)

His Highness Maharaja Sir Ghanshyamsinhji Ajitsinhji  Maharaja of Dhrangadhra, Bombay

Knight Commander (KCIE)

John Henry Kerr  Indian Civil Service, Member Bengal Executive Council

Companion (CIE)

Alexander Marr, Indian Civil Service, Financial Secretary to the Government of Bengal (on leave)
Lawrence Morley Stubbs, Indian Civil Service, Magistrate and Collector, Bareillyj United Provinces
Colonel Robert St. John Hickman  Tea Planter and Commandant of the Surma Valley Light Horse, Assam
James MacDonald Dunnett, Indian Civil Service, Deputy Commissioner in the Punjab
Lieutenant-Colonel Michael Lloyd Ferrar  Indian Army, Deputy Commissioner in the Punjab
Levett Mackenzie Kaye, Inspector-General of Police, United Provinces
Jonathan Webster Coryton Mayne, Indian Educational Service, Principal, Rajkumar College, Rajkot, Bombay
Walter Swain, Deputy Inspector-General of Police (on leave), Bihar and Orissa
Cyril James Irvin, Indian Civil Service, Deputy Commissioner, Nagpur, Central Provinces
Lancelot Colin Bradford Glascock  Senior Superintendent of Police, Delhi
Richard Howard Hitchcock  District Superintendent of Police (on military duty), Madras
Edwin Lessware Price  Merchant, Karachi, Bombay
Raj Bahadur Chuni Lai Basu  Chemical Examiner to the Government of Bengal (retired), late Sheriff of Calcutta, Bengal
Cecil Frank Beadel, Partner, Messrs. Becker, Gray and Co., Calcutta, Bengal
Gavin Scott, Indian Civil Service, President, Rangoon Municipality
Horace Mason Haywood, Secretary, Bengal Chamber of Commerce

The Royal Victorian Order

Knight Grand Cross of the Royal Victorian Order (GCVO)
The Rt. Hon. Rufus Daniel, Earl of Reading 
The Rt. Hon. Savile Brinton, Baron Somerleyton

Knight Commander of the Royal Victorian Order (KCVO)
Sir Rajendra Nath Mukharji 
Sir Alexander Campbell Mackenzie 
Richard Robert Cruise  Ophthalmic surgeon

Commander of the Royal Victorian Order (CVO)
Sir William McLintock 
Brigadier-General Sir Charles Wallis King 
Sir Francis Morgan Bryant 
Rear-Admiral Hugh Dudley Richards Watson 
Captain Basil Vernon Brooke  (dated 29 March 1922)
Vincent Esch, Architect in India
Ernest Mathews, Royal Agricultural Society

Member of the Royal Victorian Order, 4th class (MVO)
Captain Kenelm Everard Lane Creighton  
John Henry Girling 
Surgeon Commander Frank Hutton Nimmo  
Paymaster Lieutenant-Commander Leslie Norman Sampson  
Lieutenant-Colonel William Angel Scott

Member of the Royal Victorian Order, 5th class (MVO)
Superintendent Frederick William Abbott, Metropolitan Police
Superintendent William Joseph Hopkins, Metropolitan Police
Alfred Vigor Marten Robert Burns Robertson

The Most Excellent Order of the British Empire

Knight Grand Cross of the Order of the British Empire (GBE)

Civil Division

The Rt. Hon. Sir Laming Worthington-Evans

Knight Commander of the Order of the British Empire (KBE)

Military Division
Royal Navy
Vice-Admiral Thomas Dawson Lees Sheppard

Civil Division

Colonies, Protectorates, etc.
The Hon. Maui Pomare  Member of the Executive Council of the Dominion of New Zealand, representing the Native Race and Minister in Charge of the Cook Islands. For valuable services to the Empire.

Kaisar-i-Hind Medal
First Class
The Reverend Father François Bertram, Principal and Manager, St. Joseph's College, Trichinoipoly, Madras
Alice, Lady Todhunter  Madras
The Reverend Doctor Hugh Robert Scott, Missionary, Irish Presbyterian Mission in Gujarat, Bombay
Eleanore Thompson, Lady Superintendent, Medical College Hospital, Calcutta;, Bengal
Ernest Hanbury Hankin, Honorary Fellow, Allahabad University, late Chemical Examiner to Government, United Provinces
Edith Mary Brown  Principal, Women's Christian Medical College, Ludhiana, Punjab
Margaret Dobson, Lyallpur, Punjab. Lily Chatteirton, Nagpur, Central Provinces
Rao Bahadur Vinayakraoi Krishnaraoi Mulye, Revenue Member, Council of Regency, Rewa State, Central India
Susan Campbell  in charge of the Zenana Hospital, Scottish Missions, Rajputana

Air Force Cross (AFC)

Flying Officer William Forster Dickson 
Flying Officer Arthur Gordon Jarvis
Flying Officer Aubrey Robert Maxwell Rickards

Awarded a Second Bar to the Air Force Cross (AFC**) 
Flight Lieutenant Paul Ward Spencer Bulman

Imperial Service Order (ISO)
Home Civil Service
William George Bishop  H.M. Stationery Office
John Bradbury, Chief Clerk, Board of Control
Robert Henry Brodie, Assistant Keeper of Records, Public Record Office
William Henry Bulley, Inspector of Reformatory Schools, Home Office
Frederick Thomas Marshall Hughes, Land Registry
Robert Matthew Kearns, Chief Examining Surveyor, H.M. Office of Works
William Lewis, Chief Clerk, Office of Director of Public Prosecutions
Walter John Moulton, Law Section, Board of Education
Thomas Parker Porter, H.M. Consul General, Boston
William Douglas Smart, Crown Office, Edinburgh
Stanley George Spencer, Ministry of Transport
Thomas Wilson, Colonial Office

Colonial Civil Service
Wallace Haynes Cook, Secretary of the Poor Law Commissioners, Colony of British Guiana
William Burton Edwards, Acting Public Service Commissioner, Commonwealth of Australia
Jules Ellenberger, Government Secretary, Bechuanaland Protectorate
Thomas Fisher, Chief Keeper of Prisons, Colony of the Leeward Islands
John O'Donovan  lately Commissioner of Police, Dominion of New Zealand
Justinian Oxenham, Secretary, Postmaster General's Department, Commonwealth of Australia
Annand Podesta, lately Chief Clerk and Cashier, Treasury Department, Gibraltar
Candiah Stantheiram, Chief Appraiser, Customs Department, Island of Ceylon
Herbert Gordon Watson, Clerk of the Executive Council, Union of South Africa

Indian Civil Service
Major Albert William Jordon Lynsdale, Acting Professor of Materia Medica, Medical College, Madras
M. R. Ry. Diwan Bahadur Saravana Bhavanandam Pillai Avargal, Deputy Commissioner of Police, Madras
Frederick Robert Grindal, Assistant Secretary to Government, Public Works Department, Irrigation Department, Punjab
Chhaganlal Manecklal Tijoriwalla, Office Superintendent to the Commissioner of Police, Bombay
Frederick William Martin, Chief Superintendent of Excise, Burma
Babu Panna Lai Dutt, Accountant, Bengal Secretariat, Calcutta, Bengal
Cyril Hubert Martin, Registrar, Department of Revenue and Agriculture, Government of India
Sardar Sahib Sardar Bishan Singh, Deputy Superintendent of Police, Punjab
James William Septimus Inglis, Superintendent, Government of India, Foreign and Political Department
Mehta Muhkam Chand, Head Clerk, Deputy Commissioner's Office, Hazara, North-West Frontier Province

Imperial Service Medal (ISM)

Shaik Daud Ghulam Dastagir, Duffadar, Revenue Secretariat, Madras
Mahomed Eusuff Abdul Aziz, Duffadar, British Consulate Office, Pondicherry, Madras
Syed Meer Syed Mohideen, Duffadar, Collector's Office, Chittoor (retired), Madras
Janardhan Singh Hanuman Singh, Jemadar, Collector's Office, Ganjam (retired), Madras
Rustum Khan, Jemadar, Government House, United Provinces
Mathura Prasad, Compounder, Police Hospital, Bilaspur, Central Provinces
Khan Bahadur Rissaldar-Major Ahmad Bahksh, Majordomo to the Agent to the Governor-General in Baluchistan
Balu Bhikaji, Havildar of Deputy Controller of Currency, Bombay

References

Birthday Honours
1922 awards
1922 in Australia
1922 in Canada
1922 in India
1922 in New Zealand
1922 in the United Kingdom